Goldwork can refer to:

 Goldwork (embroidery)
 Works created by a goldsmith
 Gold metalwork